Karkan (also Romanized as Karkān, Karakan, Garkan and Gargan) is a village in Haram Rud-e Olya Rural District, in the Central District of Malayer County, Hamadan Province, Iran. At the 2006 census, its population was 350, in 98 families.

Google map:

https://www.google.com/maps/place/Karkan,+Hamadan+Province,+Iran/@34.3486136,48.7002361,17z/data=!3m1!4b1!4m5!3m4!1s0x3fee0a6a46699e6b:0xc966aa4e8e47a69e!8m2!3d34.3489831!4d48.702204

References 

Populated places in Malayer County